Eutornoptera is a monotypic moth genus of the family Erebidae. Its only species, Eutornoptera endosticta, is found in Cameroon. Both the genus and the species were first described by George Hampson in 1926.

References

Endemic fauna of Cameroon
Calpinae
Monotypic moth genera